The Berkovitsa rebellion or Mancho's rebellion broke out in the Berkovitsa nahiya, part of the Ottoman Empire, on 7 May 1836. It was led by Mancho Punin. That year there were also rebellions in nearby Pirot and in Belogradchik.

References

May 1836 events
Bulgarian rebellions
Ottoman period in the history of Bulgaria
19th-century rebellions
Conflicts in 1836
Rebellions against the Ottoman Empire
1836 in the Ottoman Empire